The Woman Between is a 1931 British drama film directed by Miles Mander and starring Owen Nares, Adrianne Allen and David Hawthorne. It was made at Elstree Studios by British International Pictures, the leading studio of the era. Mander adapted the film from Miles Malleson's 1925 play Conflict. The film is notable for its sexual and political content which has been attributed to a brief period of relaxation in oversight by the BBFC. It was one three similarly themed films which Allen appeared in at the time including Loose Ends and The Stronger Sex.

Premise
An aristocratic young woman becomes romantically torn between two men, once friends at University, who stand for the Conservative Party and Labour Party in an election. Both have murky recent pasts, one having been a petty thief and the other had lived outside of marriage with the heroine. Her father is left bemused by the morals of the younger generation.

Cast
 Owen Nares as Tom Smith
 Adrianne Allen as Lady Pamela
 David Hawthorne as Sir Clive Marlowe
 C.M. Hallard as Earl Bellingdon
 Barbara Hoffe as Mrs. Tremayne
 Margaret Yarde as Mrs. Robinson
 Winifred Oughton as Mrs. Jones 
 Disney Roebuck as Daniels 
 Miles Malleson as Minor Role 
 Netta Westcott as Minor Role

References

Bibliography
 Low, Rachael. Filmmaking in 1930s Britain. George Allen & Unwin, 1985.
 Richards, Jeffrey. The Unknown 1930s: An Alternative History of the British Cinema, 1929-1939. I.B. Tauris, 2000.
 Wood, Linda. British Films, 1927-1939. British Film Institute, 1986.

External links

Streaming
The Woman Between video from Internet Archive

1931 films
British drama films
1931 drama films
1930s English-language films
Films shot at British International Pictures Studios
Films directed by Miles Mander
British films based on plays
Films set in London
British black-and-white films
1930s British films